Chiromantes haematocheir is a mudflat crab of the family Sesarmidae (subfamily Sesarminae), which is endemic to East Asia. It is known under the common names red-clawed crab or akategani (Japanese) and the Latin names Grapsus haematocheir and Sesarma haematocheir. It is quite distinct from the other species placed in the genus Chiromantes, and the genus may be restricted to this one species.

Description
C. haematocheir has a square carapace with a smooth surface and irregular stripes along the sides. Males have large, smooth chelae with curved claws.  The color of these crabs varies throughout their development; juvenile crabs typically have a white or yellow carapace, while adults are usually crimson red.

Mountain crabs
This indicates that they are freshwater crabs, probably living in forest streams (if they live in water at all).

See also
Land crab

References

Grapsoidea
Crustaceans described in 1833
Taxa named by Wilhem de Haan